The Batcycle, Batblade, or Batpod is the fictional personal motorcycle of the DC Comics superhero Batman. In the comic book universe, Batman's personal Batcycle is a modified street-bike with a 786 cc liquid-cooled V-4 engine. It contains a computer-controlled carburetor and bulletproof wind-guard.

In other media

Live-action television

Batman (TV series)

The Batcycle made its first appearance in 1966 in the Batman TV series. It was a 1965 Harley Davidson with a side car, but it was taken on lease and was only used for the first season episode "Not Yet, He Ain't".

Later that year, a new Batcycle was introduced. It was produced by Kustomotive, conceived by Dan Dempski, designed by Tom Daniel, and built by Dan and Korky Korkes using a Yamaha Catalina 250. It was leased to 20th Century Fox starting on April 18, 1966 for $50 a week with an additional $350 up front. The new Batcycle was first used in the 1966 film Batman and continued to appear in the rest of the TV series. Hubie Kerns and Victor Paul did most of the stunt work with the motorcycle throughout the series. The total amount paid to Kustomotive was $2,500. When the series was canceled, Kustomotive used the Batcycle in car shows, paying royalties to Greenway, 20th Century Fox, and National Periodical Publications. Kustomotive built four replicas of the Batcycle for tours.

Robin's sidecar (a detachable self-propelled vehicle) was authenticated by Burt Ward on the television series Hollywood Treasure and sold at auction for $30,000.

Batwoman

The Batcycle appears in the series Batwoman as Batwoman's personal vehicle.

Live-action films

Batman & Robin

The Batblade is the name of a specialized motorcycle used by Batgirl (Alicia Silverstone) in the 1997 film Batman & Robin. This vehicle can function under the most extreme weather conditions.

The Batblade was built on the body of a drag racer: the rear tire comes not from a motorcycle, but from a car.

The Dark Knight Trilogy

The Batcycle is known as the Batpod for The Dark Knight (2008) and The Dark Knight Rises (2012). The bike has 20" front and rear tires and is powered by a high-performance, water-cooled, single-cylinder engine - geared toward the lower end for faster acceleration and with no exhaust pipes: the exhaust is routed through the hollow steel/aluminum/magnesium tubing used for the frame of the bike. The Batpod is steered by the shoulders instead of hands, and the rider's arms are protected by shields. The two foot pegs are set 3½ feet apart on either side of the tank, which the rider lies on, belly down. The engine noise was designed around the Shepard tone, for which sound effects came, in part, from the sound of the Tesla Roadster's electric motor. The Batpod ejects out of the Tumbler's front end, with the Tumbler's front wheels becoming the Batpod's front and rear wheels. Because the Tumbler is ordered to self-destruct, the Batpod allows Batman to continue his pursuit. For the film, the bike is armed with grappling hooks, cannons, and machine guns. Six models were constructed for the film's production to anticipate some of them crashing. One action sequence in the film shows the wheels rolling against their normal axes, seemingly for added stability in sharp turns or other maneuvers. This also allows for instant changes in direction - if the driver approaches a wall, the Batpod's central frame will rotate to keep the driver upright. The Batpod's chassis also elongates, allowing the rider to pass under low-hanging obstacles, as when Batman slaloms underneath a tractor trailer the Joker is driving. The term "Batpod" is mentioned by Alfred Pennyworth only once in the movie.

The Batpod is used again in The Dark Knight Rises (2012). At first, it serves as Batman's primary vehicle. Later, Selina Kyle uses the Batpod during the final battle against Bane's forces for the fate of Gotham. Batman uses the Bat to fight Bane's stolen Tumblers from the air while Selina uses the Batpod to open a tunnel to allow Gotham civilians to escape, to shoot Bane, and to destroy at least two of Bane's Tumblers while tracking the nuclear bomb Bane and Talia al Ghul intended to use to destroy the city. During filming on August 9, 2011, a stunt performer collided with an IMAX camera while filming a chase scene involving Kyle's Batpod.

DC Extended Universe

The Batcycle will appear in The Flash

The Batman

The Batcycle is the Batman’s sleekest mode of transport, and perfect for racing through Gotham’s streets at breakneck speeds. Throughout the movie Batman had a second main motorcycle, dubbed Drifter Motorcycle. This one is primarily used by Wayne in his civilian Drifter Outfit, while the Batcycle is used by Wayne as the Batman. He used his Drifter Motorcycle to spy on Selina Kyle, during his investigation on the serial killer, known as "The Riddler". Following Riddler's defeat, Batman would use the Batcycle to visit Selina Kyle at her mother's gravesite. He would then leave the gravesite on the Batcycle and followed Selina on her motorcycle until they went in separate directions.

Animated television

DC Animated Universe

The Batcycle was one of the many vehicles used by Batman and Robin in Batman: The Animated Series. The Batcycle was themed to look like Batman's other vehicles, the Batmobile, Batwing, and Batboat. Batman would use it in certain episodes, as would Robin. Perhaps the most important part the Batcycle played in the series was in the movie Batman: Mask of the Phantasm, where Batman jumped off the Batcycle so it would crash into a giant fan that was being controlled by the Joker. The Batcycle saw a little more use from Robin, particularly in the episode "Robin's Reckoning." Robin would continue to use a variation of the Batcycle in later seasons after he had become Nightwing.  Batman always donned a helmet, modeled to accommodate his cowl's ears, before driving the Batcycle.

The Batman

The Batcycle makes only a few appearances in The Batman.  The first is in the episode, "The Cat and the Bat," in which Catwoman steals Batman's utility belt and inadvertently sends the Batmobile careening out of control on autopilot.  Batman uses the Batcycle to catch-up with and retrieve the other vehicle.  The Batcycle's second appearance on the program is in the episode, "RPM".  The Batmobile is wrecked during a pursuit of Gearhead, and Batman must use the Batcycle to continue the battle against the villain when the rebuilt Batmobile is not fully operational in time.  The Batcycle ends up destroyed after Gearhead infects its computerized system with a nanotech virus during this same episode.

Robin uses a variation of the Batcycle featuring his own colors in The Batman.  Robin also has a similarly styled bike in the Teen Titans animated series.

Video games
Batman & Robin (Robin drives the Redbird, and Batgirl drives the Batblade)
Batman: Rise of Sin Tzu (the Batcycle and the Nightwing Cycle are unlockable 3D Models in the Trophy Room)
Lego Batman: The Video Game
Lego Batman 2: DC Superheroes
The Dark Knight (canceled)
Gotham Knights

Toys
Art Asylum created a toy version of the Batcycle for C3 Sets Wave 2 of Minimates in 2005. LEGO paired the Batcycle with "Harley Quinn's Hammer Truck" for their LEGO Batman line. In 2008, Mattell's Hot Wheels line released a 1/50 scale of the 1966 Batcycle, and in 2009, released a 1/12 scale of the same model. Both featured detachable sidecars. An upgraded 'Elite' version of the 1/12 model is also expected, with even greater detail. The Batblade has also been mentioned as a candidate for the 2010 series of 1/50 Bat-vehicles.

See also

Batmobile
Redbird

References

External links
Batman & Robin - Bikes
Television - Batman: The Series - Gadgets - Batcycle
Character Profiles - Gadgets - Batcycle
Television - Batman: The Series - Batgirl's Batcycle
Dark Knight Batpod
Fan made 1:1 scale Batpod replica - build log
Internet Movie Cars Database:
Honda Batblade in Batman & Robin, Movie, 1997
Made for Movie Batpod in The Dark Knight, Movie, 2008

Fictional elements introduced in 1956

fi:Batman#Lepakkoluola